The Luke Johnson Phone Experiment was started by 27-year-old Arizona resident Luke Johnson. On September 18, 2006, Johnson posted a self-made video on YouTube inviting the world to call him on his cell phone. The stated purpose of the experiment is to see how many people will call someone they have never met.

Since the inception of the experiment, Luke has received calls from around the planet. As of April 19, 2007 he has 136,768 telephone calls.

See also
 Social impact of YouTube

External links
 Original Video detailing the experiment

National coverage
 NPR's coverage of the Luke Johnson Phone Experiment
 CityNews
 Voice of America

State coverage
 Pennsylvania
 Arizona

International coverage
 Argentina - Ciudad
 Germany - Business News
 Germany - Spiegel Online

Radio
 91.5 KJZZ

Internet memes
American Internet celebrities
Telephony in popular culture